Manduro (March 9, 2002 – June 27, 2020) was a World Champion Thoroughbred racehorse. He was a multiple Group One winner in Germany.

Background
Sired by Monsun, he was out of the mare Mandellicht, a daughter of Northern Dancer's son Be My Guest who was the Leading sire in Great Britain & Ireland in 1982.

Manduro was purchased by Baron Georg von Ullmann, a German member of the Oppenheim banking family, who owns Gestüt Schlenderhan, one of Germany's oldest stud farms. Baron von Ullmann, who owns Manduro's sire, had previously met with considerable success in racing with a number of horses, the most notable of which was another son of Monsun, Shirocco.

Bred in Germany, Manduro was trained by André Fabre in France.

Racing career
At age two and three Manduro raced in Germany under trainer Peter Schiergen where he notably won the 2004 Group III Preis des Winterfavoriten and 2005's Preis der Deutschen Einheit.

In 2006, he raced from a base in France for trainer André Fabre where he won the Group II Prix d'Harcourt at Longchamp Racecourse in Paris and finished second twice and third three times in five Group One events.

Ridden by Stéphane Pasquier, in 2007 Manduro was undefeated in five starts and the dominant horse in Europe for most of the year. He won three major races in France and two in England but came out of his win in September's Prix Foy with a cannon bone fracture that ended his racing career and which kept him out of the Prix de l'Arc de Triomphe at Longchamp Racecourse. The Arc was won by Dylan Thomas whom Manduro had earlier defeated by a length and a quarter in the Prince of Wales's Stakes.

Assessment
In January 2008, the International Federation of Horseracing Authorities (IFHA) ranked Manduro No.1 in the world for 2007.

Stud record
Retired to stud duty, Manduro would stand in 2008 at Sheikh Mohammed's Darley Stud. Manduro died of a heart attack at Darley Stud on June 27, 2020.

Major winners
c = colt, f = filly, g = gelding

Pedigree

References

 Manduro's pedigree and partial racing stats with photos
 BBC Sport article titled Prince of Wales win for Manduro
 International Federation of Horseracing Authorities 2007 World Thoroughbred Racehorse Rankings

2002 racehorse births
2020 racehorse deaths
Racehorses bred in Germany
Racehorses trained in Germany
Racehorses trained in France
Thoroughbred family 3-d